JCO Oncology Practice (known from 2005 to 2019 as the Journal of Oncology Practice) is a monthly peer-reviewed medical journal covering the mechanics of oncology care. It was established in 2005 and is published by the American Society of Clinical Oncology. The editor-in-chief is John V. Cox (UT Southwestern Medical Center). The editor-in-chief designate is Jeffrey Peppercorn (Massachusetts General Hospital).

History 
The first issue was managed by then-editor in chief Douglas Blayney (Stanford), and was published in May 2005 featuring "... material on oncologic best practice methods originated by our colleagues, who may care for patients in office, hospital out-patient, academic, or home-care settings. These pieces may be first-authored, multi-authored, or may result from interviews by our staff." Blayney was succeeded by John V. Cox (University of Texas Southwestern) in 2008. JCO Oncology Practice is co-published by the American Society of Clinical Oncology and Harborside Press.

Indexing 
JCO Oncology Practice is indexed in:  
 Science Citation Index 
 PubMed 
 SCOPUS 
 Hinari
 EMBASE 
 CINAHL

See also 
Journal of Clinical Oncology
JCO Clinical Cancer Informatics

References

External links 
 

Oncology journals
English-language journals
Monthly journals
Publications established in 2005
Academic journals published by learned and professional societies